The first season of Objetivo Fama began in 2004. The season featured a varying panel of judges, including Roberto Sueiro, who is the only remaining judge of the original season. The show was hosted by Nicaraguan singer Luis Enrique.

Auditions
Auditions were held in several towns and cities of Puerto Rico.

Final Cutdown
Out of each audition, a group 18 contestants were selected. This was the only season to feature only Puerto Rican contestants.

The 18 selected contestants, in alphabetical order, were:

* Age was taken at the beginning of the contest (2004)

Weekly Shows

Quarter-finals

Controversies
 Kany García was the first contestant eliminated from the show, due to a car accident she had after the first show. However, she recovered and has launched a successful career as a singer and songwriter.
 Natalia Acosta was also eliminated from the show to a throat illness.

After the Show
 Season winner Janina Irizarry has released three moderately successful albums: Todo De Mí (2005), Contra La Corriente (2006), and Janina (2009)
 Second finalist Sheila Romero has also released three albums: Mucho Más por Vivir (2007), En Tus Manos (2009), and Fiel (2013)
 Third finalist Ektor released his first album titled Un Paso del Amor in 2005. After that, he has turned his career towards acting and painting.
 Fourth finalist Daniel Mercado and fellow contestants Luis Montes and Elliot Suro, joined Lorenzo Duarte in MDO. They released two successful albums together: Otra Vez (2005) and Sabe A Tí (2008).
 After recovering from her accident, Kany García has become a successful singer and songwriter, even writing songs to the shows winner, Janina. In 2007, she released her first album titled Cualquier Dia on which she won two Billboard Latin Music Awards and two Latin Grammys for Best New Artist and Best Female Pop Vocal Album. She has released two more albums: Boleto de Entrada (2009) and Kany Garcia (2012)
 Charlie Rodríguez was the first contestant to release an album with Color Secreto, in 2005.
 Héctor Gotay released a gospel album in 2007.

References

External links
 Objetivo Fama Official Page

Objetivo Fama